Dominic Matheson (born 19 January 1992), better known by his stage name Dom Dolla, is an Australian house music producer. He has been nominated twice for the ARIA Award for Best Dance Release; in 2017 for "Be Randy", with Torren Foot and in 2019, for the song "Take It". He won the award  at the 2020 ARIA Music Awards for the song "San Frandisco".

Career

2013–present
In 2013 Dom Dolla released his debut single "The Boxer". In March 2015, Dolla released "Love Like This". In July 2015, Dolla released the song "Define" with Go Freek. The song was number 2 in the ARIA Club End Of Year Chart.

In July 2015 dolla released "Define" which reached number one on the ARIA Club Chart. In September 2016, Dolla released "You" which reached number one again on the ARIA Club Chart in October 2016. In August 2017, Dolla reached number one again on the ARIA Club Chart with "Be Randy" with Torren Foot. At the ARIA Music Awards of 2017, the song was nominated for ARIA Award for Best Dance Release, losing out to "Chameleon" by Pnau.

In October 2018, Dolla reached number one for a forth time on the ARIA Club Chart with "Take It". At the ARIA Music Awards of 2019, the song was nominated for ARIA Award for Best Dance Recording, losing out to Solace by Rüfüs Du Sol.

In November 2019, Dolla reached number one for a fifth time on the ARIA Club Chart with "San Frandisco". In January 2020, the song polled at number 33 in the Triple J Hottest 100, 2019.

In August 2020, Dolla reached number one for a sixth time on the ARIA Club Chart with "Moving Blind".

In March 2023, Dolla reached number one for a seventh time on the ARIA Club Chart with "Rhyme Dust".

Discography

Singles

Awards and nominations

AIR Awards
The AIR Awards celebrates the highest-selling Australian independent artists annualal. Dom Dolla has been nominated for three awards.

|-
| AIR Awards of 2019
| "Take It"
| Best Independent Dance, Electronica or Club Single
| 
|-
| rowspan="2"| AIR Awards of 2020
| rowspan="2"| "San Frandisco"
| Best Independent Single
| 
|-
| Best Independent Dance, Electronica or Club Single
| 
|-

APRA Awards
The APRA Awards are held in Australia and New Zealand by the Australasian Performing Right Association to recognise songwriting skills, sales and airplay performance by its members annually. Dom Dollar has been nominated for one award.

|-
| 2020
| "Take It"
| Most Performed Dance Work of the Year
| 
|-
| 2021
| "San Frandisco"
| Most Performed Dance Work of the Year
| 
|-

ARIA Music Awards
The ARIA Music Awards are annual awards, which recognises excellence, innovation, and achievement across all genres of Australian music. Dom Dolla has won one award from four nominations.

! 
|-
| 2017 || "Be Randy"  || Best Dance Release ||  ||
|-
| 2019 || "Take It" || Best Dance Release ||  ||
|-
| 2020 || "San Frandisco" || Best Dance Release ||  || 
|-
| 2021 || "Pump the Brakes" || Best Dance Release ||  || 
|}

Music Victoria Awards
The Music Victoria Awards are an annual awards night celebrating Victorian music. They commenced in 2006.

! 
|-
| Music Victoria Awards of 2017
| Dom Dolla
| Best Electronic Act
| 
| 
|-

References

External links
 
 

1992 births 
ARIA Award winners
Australian musicians
Electronic musicians
House musicians
Living people